Freester is a settlement on Mainland, Shetland, Scotland. It is in the parish of Nesting.

References

External links

Canmore - Hard Knowe site record

Villages in Mainland, Shetland